Odd Fellows Hall is a former meeting hall of the Crescent Lodge No. 3 of the Independent Order of Odd Fellows. It is located on Commerce Street in Occoquan, Virginia. The Hall was erected in 1889 by volunteer Lodge members and a paid carpenter.  The first floor of the Hall has been continuously used as a public meeting room and theater.  The Odd Fellows reserved the second floor for their meetings.  The Masons, American Legion, church congregations and other groups have met in the Hall over the years.  

Buildings and structures in Prince William County, Virginia
Odd Fellows buildings in Virginia